Sommet Sports was a sports-oriented television channel operated in New Zealand that was broadcast on channel 14 on Freeview NZ. It offered a varied range of sporting events, some of which had never been screened in New Zealand. This included live weekly coverage of the German Bundesliga, delayed Liverpool FC matches from the English Premier League and coverage of the former SKY-broadcast Moto GP.

Sommet Sports was officially launched on 18 July 2013 after delays, the original launch date for the channel was 18 April 2013. The channel is available to Freeview HD homes via an UHF aerial. Sommet Sports was later made available on the Freeview Satellite service as the old Prime location was vacated and added to the Sky channel line-up.

At 11 am on 12 December 2014, Sommet Sports released a statement saying they would cease transmission at midday the same day. The statement cites lack of promised funds as the reason why the channel closed down.

In January 2015 a crowdfunding proposal under the slogan "Sommet Strikes Back" was devised to get the station back up and running. It sought NZ$300,000 at the minimum. By mid-March only about NZ$50,000 was pledged and the project was declared unsuccessful.

Sports coverage
Some sports broadcast by Sommet Sports included:

Australian rules football
 Australian Football League: 6 Games LIVE Per week plus 2 delayed games, Finals LIVE

Mixed martial arts
 World Series of Fighting

American football
 NFL

Football 
 Bundesliga (LIVE coverage every week)
 DFB-Pokal
 UEFA Europa League
 Football League Championship
 Football League Cup
 England Home Internationals
 FA Community Shield
 LFC TV: Delayed Premier League match per week showing Liverpool fixtures
 ASB Premiership (Waitakere United home fixtures only)

Golf
 LPGA (featuring New Zealander Lydia Ko) 
 The Evian Championship 
 HSBC Women's Champions 
 World Skins European Senior's Tour 
 Great Golf Destinations: TV Show
 PowerPlay Golf 
 Spirit of Golf: TV Show

Cricket
 Caribbean Premier League
 Sri Lanka tour to Bangladesh 2014 
 2014 Asia Cup

Cycling
 Giro d'Italia

Motorsports
 Moto GP
 24 Hours of Le Mans
 Monster Jam
 Freestyle Motocross
 AMA Supercross Championship
 FIA European Championships for Rallycross Drivers 
 2013 FIA World Endurance Championship season

References

External links
 Official Site

Defunct television channels in New Zealand
Sports television networks in New Zealand
Television channels and stations established in 2013
English-language television stations in New Zealand